Sir George Charles Radda  (born 9 June 1936) is a Hungarian - British chemist. In 1957, he attended Merton College, Oxford, to study chemistry, having set aside an earlier interest in literary criticism. His early work was concerned with the development and use of fluorescent probes for the study of structure and function of membranes and enzymes. He became interested in using spectroscopic methods including nuclear magnetic resonance (NMR) to study complex biological material. In 1974, his research paper was the first to introduce the use of NMR to study tissue metabolites. In 1981, he and his colleagues published the first scientific report on the clinical application of his work. This resulted in the installation of a magnet large enough to accommodate the whole human body for NMR investigations in 1983 at the John Radcliffe Hospital in Oxford.

In 1982, Radda published about the relationship between deoxygenated haemoglobin and the NMR signal.

From 1996, until his retirement in 2004, Sir George was Chief Executive of the Medical Research Council in the UK. Currently, Sir George is the new head of the merged departments of Physiology and Human Anatomy and Genetics at the University of Oxford and Chairman of the Singapore Bioimaging Consortium, a research institute of ASTAR in Singapore.

Awards 

He has received numerous prestigious awards and honours for his pioneering efforts in using spectroscopic techniques for metabolic studies, including a Buchanan Medal in 1987, an CBE in June 1993 and a knighthood in June 2000. He is a Fellow of Merton College, Oxford, a Fellow of the Royal Society and is a British Heart Foundation Professor of Molecular Cardiology. He has also been awarded many distinguished prizes throughout his scientific career. He is an Honorary Member of the American Heart Association and was awarded the Citation for International Achievement.

In 2015, he was conferred an award as an Honorary Citizen of Singapore.

References 

1936 births
Living people
British people of Hungarian descent
Commanders of the Order of the British Empire
Fellows of Merton College, Oxford
Fellows of the Royal Society
Hungarian emigrants to England
Knights Bachelor
Honorary Citizens of Singapore
Naturalised citizens of the United Kingdom
British expatriates in Singapore
Hungarian expatriates in Singapore